The Electronic Disturbance Theater (EDT), established in 1997 by performance artist and writer Ricardo Dominguez, is an electronic company of cyber activists, critical theorists, and performance artists who engage in the development of both the theory and practice of non-violent acts of defiance across and between digital and non-digital spaces.

History
The Electronic Disturbance Theater was founded in 1997 by Ricardo Dominguez, Brett Stalbaum, Stefan Wray and Carmin Karasic. Taking the idea of the American Civil Rights Movement of the 1960s, the EDT members used their real names. As a collective, they organized and programmed computer software to show their views against anti-propagandist and military actions, mobilizing micronetworks to act in solidarity by staging virtual sit-ins online and allowing the emergence of a collective presence in direct digital actions.

A second iteration of the group, called Electronic Disturbance Theater 2.0, included Brett Stalbaum, Amy Sara Carroll, Elle Mehrmand, Micha Cárdenas, and Ricardo Dominguez.

FloodNet

The group's objective was, with the use of digital media and internet based technology, to demonstrate nonviolent resistance in support of the Zapatista rebels residing in the state of Chiapas in Mexico. EDT uses both e-mail and the Internet to promote their work around the world, encouraging fellow supporters to download and run a tool based on HTML (Hyper Text Markup Language) and Java applet (an internet program used to help support interactive web-based features or programs that a HTML cannot provide alone) called FloodNet.  FloodNet is a computer-based program, created by members of the Electronic Disturbance theater company Carmin Karasic and Brett Stalbaum.

The FloodNet program would simply reload a URL for short several times, effectively slowing the website and network server down (a DDOS attack), if a high number of protesters were to join in the sit-in at one time. The EDT would first execute the FloodNet software in what would be for them a dress rehearsal before attacking their main targets on April 10, 1998, and a month later, on both Mexican and American government websites, representing both the Mexican President Ernesto Zedillo and American President Bill Clinton.

FloodNet would work on this basic idea taken from street theater practices and political rallies and protest, but instead present it on a much larger and international stage, with the facilitation of macro-networks and non-digital forms of action.
Ricardo Dominguez took up the idea of the Floodnet from the "netstrike" organized by the Florentine group Strano Network. On December 21, 1995, the first world Virtual sit-in, conceived by Tommaso Tozzi, was created by the Florentine group Strano Network against the French government to protest against the nuclear tests in Mururoa and was defined as a "Netstrike".

The EDT's mission was to allow the voices of the Zapatista Army of National Liberation to be heard, after the attack on the small remote village of Acteal in Chiapas, Mexico. The Paramilitary, a government-funded military squad, surrounded a Catholic church during a Tsotsil Mayan (a spoken Mexican language from around the Chiapas area of Mexico). For the next several hours the Paramilitary shot everyone to death, those inside the church and any who tried to escape, resulting in the death of fifteen children, nine men, and twenty-one women, four of whom were pregnant, on December 22, 1997. This event became known as the Acteal Massacre. Those who were convicted of this crime were later released in the Supreme Court to the outrage of many, after ignoring eyewitness reports and allowing those who confessed to this crime on humanity. Instead, the Supreme Court focused on the mismanagement of the investigation and the fabrication of evidence.

The Electronic Disturbance Theater took notice of these actions when others did not and arranged their first act of electronic civil disobedience against the Mexican Government. In a subsequent version of FloodNet, those who had downloaded the FloodNet program in support of the Zapatistas were asked to repeatedly input the names of those that had lost their lives at the hands of the Mexican Army in military attacks.  This would then target the servers to return an error message each time these URLs would be requested.  This data request would be stored in a server's error log and in the eyes of the Zapatista Army of National Liberation and the Electronic Disturbance Theater group, a symbolic list of those 45 Acteal civilians who had died straight to their murderers.  If enough people used the FloodNet applet, this would cause the computer server running the website to overload, so that when a regular visitor or someone working within the site tried to access the website or send company based emails and files, the pages would either load extremely slowly or not at all.  This worked on the same basis of a real sit-in demonstration, where the protesters block the entrance to a public building of their oppressors and preventing access to the building.

With around 25% of the world's population in one way or another connected to the World Wide Web, with the use of dial-up internet connection, wired or wireless internet broadband connection and even mobile internet technology, every one of these means of communication can allow the internet to be used as a means of non-violent action within human rights, and is viewable around the world, and can be translated into different languages but most importantly not controlled by the government.  The EDT networked performances have already opened access and communication between three unlikely micro-networks: net.art, net.activism, and net.hackers. With technology always evolving there is no telling how these areas will grow.

However, on June 10, 1998, the EDT struck the Mexican Secretaria de Gobernacion (Secretary of Government), which is involved in immigration policies as well as Mexico's federal public security forces working in conjunction with the military Zapatista communities in Chiapas unsuccessfully.  The Mexican government would have a programmed countermeasure in place. This is what the EDT believe took place.  A countermeasure built into the operating JavaScript was placed in the Secretaria de Gobernacion's website that was designed to activate whenever FloodNet was directed toward its servers.  Upon activation, the website would open window after window on the FloodNet user's Internet browser. If the FloodNet user remained connected long enough, their browser, whether it is Netscape or Internet Explorer, could crash the activist's computer, forcing the activist to reboot their system and stopping the FloodNet program at the source.  The EDT has since dealt with both the Mexican government both online and offline and the United States Department of Defense, which has now inserted a counter attack system into their internet browser-based coding to prevent any more FloodNet-based attacks to the system and server.

The FloodNet system was used again against the World Trade Organization in 1999, where the group would release their online civil disobedience software to the public under the name "Disturbance Development's Kit".

Electronic Disturbance Theater 2.0
The group received media attention for their 2007 project, the Transborder Immigrant Tool (TBT), which sends experimental poetry to users in addition to helping them find water and safe routes when crossing the Mexican-American border. EDT have described this project as the next step of electronic civil disobedience, or ECD 2.0. The Transborder Immigrant Tool was shown in numerous museums and galleries in 2010, including the California Biennial at the Orange County Museum of Art, the Museum of Contemporary Art San Diego, and the Galería de la Raza in San Francisco. The project is maintained by California Institute for Telecommunications and Information Technology.

Electronic Disturbance Theater came under investigation for their virtual sit-in in support of the 2010 March 4 strikes and occupations in support of public education.

See also
 Anonymous
 E-democracy
 E-participation
 Electronic civil disobedience
 Hacktivism
 Internet activism

References

Internet-based activism
Art websites
International artist groups and collectives
Net.artists
Arts organizations established in 1997